In Greek mythology, the name Hyperippe (Ancient Greek: Ὑπερίππη) may refer to:

 Hyperippe, daughter of Danaus and Crino, who married and killed Hippocorystes, son of Aegyptus and Hephaestine.
 Hyperippe, daughter of Arcas and one of the possible wives of Endymion.
 Hyperippe, daughter of Leucon, son of Athamas and Themisto.
Hyperippe, daughter of Munichus and Lelante, sister of Alcander, Philaeus and Megaletor. The family were just and righteous, and were favored by the gods. When one night robbers set their house afire, Zeus would not let them die such a miserable death and transformed them into different birds. Hyperippe was changed into a diver, because she jumped into water to escape fire.

Notes

References 

 Antoninus Liberalis, The Metamorphoses of Antoninus Liberalis translated by Francis Celoria (Routledge 1992). Online version at the Topos Text Project.
 Apollodorus, The Library with an English Translation by Sir James George Frazer, F.B.A., F.R.S. in 2 Volumes, Cambridge, MA, Harvard University Press; London, William Heinemann Ltd. 1921. . Online version at the Perseus Digital Library. Greek text available from the same website.
Hesiod, Catalogue of Women from Homeric Hymns, Epic Cycle, Homerica translated by Evelyn-White, H G. Loeb Classical Library Volume 57. London: William Heinemann, 1914. Online version at theoi.com
 Pausanias, Description of Greece with an English Translation by W.H.S. Jones, Litt.D., and H.A. Ormerod, M.A., in 4 Volumes. Cambridge, MA, Harvard University Press; London, William Heinemann Ltd. 1918. . Online version at the Perseus Digital Library
 Pausanias, Graeciae Descriptio. 3 vols. Leipzig, Teubner. 1903.  Greek text available at the Perseus Digital Library.

Danaids
Metamorphoses into birds in Greek mythology
Women in Greek mythology
Arcadian characters in Greek mythology
Boeotian characters in Greek mythology
Deeds of Zeus
Elean mythology
Epirotic mythology